Deportivo Anzoátegui Sport Club was a professional football club based in Puerto La Cruz, Anzoátegui. It was founded in 2002 and promoted to the Venezuelan 1st division in 2007. They won the Copa de Venezuela in 2008, and were dissolved in 2019.

History
The club was founded on 9 November 2002 by Juan Pereira, starting in the third tier of Venezuelan football.  In this first season they finished unbeaten, winning the division and gaining promotion.

They participated in the Venezuelan Second Division for four seasons, winning promotion at the end of the 2006–07 season when the Venezuelan Premier Division expanded from 10 to 18 teams.

In 2008, they won the Copa Venezuela by defeating Estudiantes de Mérida in the final, winning 3–1 on aggregate with goals from Alexander Rondon, Emerson Panigutti and Nicolás Massia.

Colours and Badge
The team plays in the colours of yellow and red.
The club crest contains an outline of the state of Anzoátegui where the club is based, the year the club was formed as well as a star to commemorate their (at present) only league championship in the 3rd division

Stadium

The club plays their home games at Estadio José Antonio Anzoátegui in the city of Puerto La Cruz.  It  was built specially for the Copa America 2007 on the site of the previous stadium.

Players

Current squad

Achievements
Segunda División Venezolana: 2
2004 (C), 2007 (A)

Tercera División Venezolana: 1
2003

Copa de Venezuela: 2
2008, 2012

Performance in CONMEBOL competitions
Copa Libertadores: 3 appearances
2009: Preliminary Round
2013: Preliminary Round
2014:

Copa Sudamericana: 3 appearances
2009: First Round
2011: Second Round
2013: First Round

Records
Biggest Home win: 10–0 vs Atlético Venezuela (27/4/2011)
Biggest Away win: 7–1 vs Caroní (7/11/2010)

Former Managers
  Carlos Maria Ravel (2002–03)
  René Torres (2003)
  Daniel Lanata (2003–04)
  Miguel Oswaldo González (2004–05)
  Félix Gutierrez (2005)
  Daniel Lanata (2005)
   Carlos Horacio Moreno (2005–06)
  Stalin Rivas (2007)
  César Farías (2007)
  Marcos Mathías (2007–08)
  José Hernández (2009)
  Daniel Farías (March 13, 2009 – Dec 31, 2012)
  Juvencio Betancourt (Dec 12, 2012–14)
  Ruberth Morán (2014)
  Nicolás Larcamón (201?–)

External links

Official Site 

Association football clubs established in 2002
Football clubs in Venezuela
Sport in Puerto la Cruz
2002 establishments in Venezuela
Defunct football clubs in Venezuela